Records concerning the history of French airships in US Navy service are fragmentary. A number of airships of various classes were operated by the US Navy (USN) during World War I from the French Naval Base at Paimbœuf, which was designated a US Navy Air Station from 1 March 1918 onward. It appears that at least 13 French manufactured airships were operated by the USN from Paimbœuf; six were eventually shipped to the United States and one was returned to France before the armistice. The Navy operated or ordered four Astra-Torres type airships, one T-2—the Captain Caussin, two CM types, and three or four VZ types.

Astra-Torres blimps
The USN operated AT-1, AT-13 and AT-17. AT-18 was ordered but cancelled. Missions were flown by the first two airships during the war and included training, convoy patrol, mine spotting, and anti-submarine operations. There is no record of flights in the United States by the three AT airships which were shipped there after the armistice. AT-1 was stricken from Naval records in July 1920 at the Naval Aircraft Factory; AT-13 was stricken in October 1920 at Hampton Roads, and AT-17 was transferred to the US Army at Langley Field in October 1919.

Chalais-Meudon (French State Airship Factory)
The US Navy purchased the CM-5, which was completed after the armistice. The CM-5 was shipped to Akron, where it was offered for sale. There is no record of the USN operating the CM-5. One engine car from the CM-5 is in the New England Air Museum at Windsor Locks, Connecticut.

The US Navy also operated a T-2 type Chalais-Meudon airship Capitaine Caussin. The Capitaine Caussin was operated for training at Paimbœuf and Guipavas. It was shipped to Hampton Roads, but was not erected or flown after arriving there.

Vedette Zodiac
The Zodiac Group built the VZ-7 and VZ-13. Both were operated at NAS Paimboeuf before the armistice and flew combat missions. They were shipped first to Norfolk, and then Coco Solo, where they were scrapped in October 1919. Zodiac VZ-3 was operated by the USN at Paimbœuf during 1918, but was returned to the French in September of that year. The Zodiac ZDUS-1 and ZDUS-2 were ordered by the Navy and shipped to the US. Never operated by the Navy they were both apparently transferred to the Army, and one, the ZDUS-1, was operated by the Army at Langley Field, where the name was changed to ZD-1 and then to RN-1. The RN-1 was rebuilt with a significantly modified and lightened control car and two  Liberty engines replacing the Renaults. In 1923 the RN-1 was rebuilt at Scott Field (Oklahoma). A new  envelope was provided, the control car was further modified and the two  Liberty engines were replaced by Packards. RN-1 was put in storage at Scott Field during 1924. Scrapping followed.

References

 http://www.blimp-n2a.com/zodiac.htm
Bibliography

External links
 - silent footage including the ZDUS-1, specifications shown at 20:00

Airships of the United States Navy